Shooting at the 1976 Summer Paralympics consisted of three rifle events.

Medal summary

References 

 

1976 Summer Paralympics events
1976
Paralympics
Shooting competitions in Canada